State Route 395 (SR 395), also known as Rock Creek Road, is a  long east-west state highway in Unicoi County, Tennessee. It connects the town of Erwin with the Rock Creek Recreation Area of the Cherokee National Forest and North Carolina Highway 197 (NC 197) at the state line.

Route description

SR 395 begins in Erwin at an intersection with SR 107 north of downtown. It heads east through neighborhoods before entering the mountains, and the Cherokee National Forest, to pass by the Rock Creek Recreation Area. SR 395 then turns south and winds its way up as it ascends the mountains to Indian Grave Gap and the North Carolina state line, where it continues south as NC 197. The entire route of SR 395 is a two-lane highway.

Major intersections

References

395
Transportation in Unicoi County, Tennessee